Waterlandkerkje is a village in the Dutch province of Zeeland. It is located in the municipality of Sluis.

The village was first mentioned in 1740 as "de Kerk op Waterland, en doorgaans Nieuw of Klein Kerkje geheeten", and means "little church of Waterland". Waterland was a region which was flooded in 1375. The church originally stood in Waterland-Oudeman but was moved across the border. The church burned down in 1708, and was rebuilt in 1713.

Waterlandkerkje was a separate municipality until 1970, when it was merged with Oostburg. In 2003, it became part of the municipality of Sluis.

Gallery

References

Populated places in Zeeland
Former municipalities of Zeeland
Sluis